is a railway station on the Kagoshima Main Line operated by JR Kyushu located in Higashi-ku, Fukuoka Prefecture, Japan.

Lines

Layout
The station consists of two island platforms serving four tracks.

Adjacent stations

History
Japanese Government Railways (JGR) opened  on 1 June 1915. With the privatization of Japanese National Railways (JNR), the successor of JGR, on 1 April 1987, JR Kyushu took over control of the station. The station was renamed Fukkōdai-mae on 15 March 2008. The name means, literally, "in front of the Fukuoka Institute of Technology".

Passenger statistics
In fiscal 2016, the station was used by 11,468 passengers daily, and it ranked 12th among the busiest stations of JR Kyushu.

See also 
List of railway stations in Japan

References

External links
Fukkōdai-mae (JR Kyushu)

Railway stations in Fukuoka Prefecture